Brian Lee Pittman (born October 21, 1980) is an American musician most notable as the former bassist for the Christian rock band Relient K, of which he was a founding member. He has also played bass for the Christian metal band Inhale Exhale, and owns a landscaping company called Aura Concrete & Landscaping. Pittman married on August 30, 2008 and currently resides in Canal Fulton, Ohio.

Bands

Relient K
Pittman played bass for Relient K from the band's beginning in 1998 until Bleach's farewell show on August 29, 2004. He contributed to 13 Relient K projects, including five full-length albums, four EPs, a two-track single, and two Christmas albums. The last album he contributed to was Mmhmm (the band's fourth album), along with longtime bandmates Matt Thiessen, Matt Hoopes, and Dave Douglas. Some people think the song "For the Band", which is found on Relient K's Employee of the Month EP, was written about his leaving, but that is unlikely, as that song was recorded two years before his departure. Though he left the band in August 2004, he returned to play with the band during their CD release show for Mmhmm on November 1, 2004 at the Newport Music Hall in Columbus, Ohio.

Inhale Exhale
Shortly after leaving Relient K, Pittman joined the band Inhale Exhale. They released their first album on November 21, 2006, entitled The Lost. The Sick. The Sacred. Pittman reportedly claimed after leaving Relient K that he wanted to play a different genre of Christian music, and said before that he grew up preferring metal music more. Inhale Exhale's style is much heavier than Relient K's.

Discography
Pittman has been on a combined fourteen releases with Relient K and Inhale Exhale. He has also appeared in three music videos for Relient K, and two videos with Inhale Exhale.
He appears in Relient K's second Christmas album as bass on tracks 5, 6, 7, 8, 11, 12, 13, 14, and 16.

With Relient K
All Work and No Play (1998)
2000 A.D.D. (2000)
Relient K (album) (2000)
"My Girlfriend" music video (2000)
The Creepy EP (2001)
The Anatomy of the Tongue in Cheek (2001)
"Pressing On" music video (2001)
"The Pirates Who Don't Do Anything" (2002)
Employee of the Month EP (2002)
Two Lefts Don't Make a Right...but Three Do (2003)
"Chap Stick, Chapped Lips, and Things Like Chemistry" music video (2003)
The Vinyl Countdown (2003)
Deck the Halls, Bruise Your Hand (2003)
Mmhmm (2004)
Let It Snow Baby... Let It Reindeer (2007) (on tracks recorded in 2003 or earlier)
The Bird and the Bee Sides (2008) (on tracks recorded in 2004 or earlier)

With Inhale Exhale
The Lost. The Sick. The Sacred. (2006)
"Redemption" music video (2006)
"A Call to the Faithful" music video (2007)

See also
Inhale Exhale
Relient K

References 

Living people
1980 births
American performers of Christian music
Relient K members
Musicians from Canton, Ohio
Guitarists from Ohio
American male guitarists
American male bass guitarists
21st-century American bass guitarists